Bacon County is a county located in the southeastern part of the U.S. state of Georgia. As of the 2020 census, the population was 11,140. The county seat is Alma.

History
The constitutional amendment to create the county was proposed July 7, 1914, and ratified November 3, 1914. It is 
named after Augustus Bacon, a former United States Senator and segregationist from Georgia.

Geography

The majority and western portion of Bacon County is located in the Satilla River sub-basin of the St. Marys River-Satilla River basin. The entire eastern and half of the southeastern edge of the county is located in the Little Satilla River sub-basin of the same St. Marys-Satilla River basin.

Major highways
  U.S. Route 1
  U.S. Route 23
  Georgia State Route 4
  State Route 4 Alternate
  State Route 19
  State Route 32
  State Route 203

Adjacent counties
 Appling County (northeast)
 Pierce County (east)
 Ware County (south)
 Coffee County (west)
 Jeff Davis County (northwest)

Demographics

2000 census
As of the census of 2000,  10,103 people, 3,833 households, and 2,813 families were living in the county. The population density was 36 people per square mile (14/km2). The 4,464 housing units' average density was 16 per square mile (6/km2). The racial makeup of the county was 81.48% White, 15.70% African American, 0.15% Native American, 0.30% Asian, 1.46% from other races, and 0.91% from two or more races. About 3.39% of the population were Hispanic or Latino of any race.

Of the 3,833 households, 33.00% had children under the age of 18 living with them, 55.20% were married couples living together, 14.10% had a female householder with no husband present, and 26.60% were not families. About 23.60% of all households were made up of individuals, and 9.50% had someone living alone who was 65 years of age or older. The average household size was 2.60, and the average family size was 3.03.

In the county, the population was distributed as 26.20% under the age of 18, 9.90% from 18 to 24, 28.00% from 25 to 44, 23.00% from 45 to 64, and 12.80% who were 65 years of age or older. The median age was 35 years. For every 100 females, there were 96.10 males. For every 100 females age 18 and over, there were 91.40 males.

Males had a median income of $27,780 versus $19,049 for females. The per capita income for the county was $14,289. About 20.20% of families and 23.70% of the population were below the poverty line, including 31.40% of those under age 18 and 25.70% of those age 65 or over.

2010 census
As of the 2010 United States Census, 11,096 people, 4,214 households, and 2,960 families were living in the county. The racial makeup of the county was 78.6% White, 15.4%  African American, 0.3% Asian, 0.2% American Indian, 0.1% Pacific Islander, 4.1% from other races, and 1.3% from two or more races. Those of Hispanic or Latino origin made up 7.1% of the population. In terms of ancestry, 15.3% were American, 10.9% were English, and 6.2% were Irish.

Of the 4,214 households, 35.9% had children under the age of 18 living with them, 50.4% were married couples living together, 14.8% had a female householder with no husband present, 29.8% were not families, and 25.7% of all households were made up of individuals. The average household size was 2.56, and the average family size was 3.05. The median age was 36.9 years.

The median income for a household in the county was $31,429 and for a family was $45,442. Males had a median income of $35,102 versus $25,384 for females. The per capita income for the county was $17,110. About 11.6% of families and 16.5% of the population were below the poverty line, including 18.8% of those under age 18 and 16.8% of those age 65 or over.

2020 census

As of the 2020 United States census, there were 11,140 people, 3,874 households, and 2,706 families residing in the county.

Communities

City
 Alma (county seat)

Unincorporated communities
 Coffee
 Rockingham

Politics

Education

See also

 Bacon County Courthouse
 National Register of Historic Places listings in Bacon County, Georgia
 Bacon County High School
List of counties in Georgia

References

External links
 Description at georgia.gov
 Bacon County historical marker

 
Georgia (U.S. state) counties
1914 establishments in Georgia (U.S. state)
Populated places established in 1914